Laal Kabootar is a 2019 Pakistani action crime thriller film directed by Kamal Khan, produced by Hania Chima and Kamil Chima, and written by Ali Abbas Naqvi. Taha Malik is the music director while Danial Hyatt, son of Rohail Hyatt, provides the background score. The film features Ahmed Ali Akbar, Mansha Pasha, Rashid Farooqui, Raza Gillani, Syed Mohammad Ahmed, and Ali Kazmi.  The film was released on 22 March 2019.

Laal Kabootar's TV premiere was on 31 August 2019 on Geo Entertainment. It was Pakistan's official entry for 92nd Academy Awards, but it was not nominated.

Plot 
When Alia's (Mansha Pasha) husband, Noman Malik (Ali Kazmi), is murdered in a brutal target killing in Karachi, she seeks answers and revenge. Up against a lazy justice system, as well as a social structure that isn't kind to single women, she pushes ahead in fury. Finally, she comes across Adeel (Ahmed Ali), a cab driver with his own set of troubles. Adeel's dreams of going to Dubai aren't materializing, even though he indulges in petty crimes. He offers to help Alia find her husband's killer in return for money. Alia offers double in return if he kills the assassin instead. Left with no choice, Adeel starts to try and find the assassin with the help of other criminals around him.

Alia reaches out to Inspector Ibrahim (Rashid Farooqui), a corrupt police officer who doesn't seem much interested in her case and instead mocks her for struggling to find the assassin. However, the inspector is investigating a case involving Adeel on the other side, resulting in a raid on his house that he narrowly escapes. The two cases become connected when it's discovered that a business tycoon is behind all these crimes. A greedy Inspector Ibrahim arranges a meeting with him and tries convincing him for a bribe, but the man rejects his offer and gives him a measly 5000 rupees, asking him to leave. Infuriated, Ibrahim smashes his car's windows and puts forth his demand: if he isn't paid 20 million, he will now charge the man with murder and land theft.

On the other hand, Adeel finally tracks down Noman's assassin. He poses as an innocent man visiting his place, but the assassin already has a trap planned for him. Adeel is threatened to be killed unless he reveals Alia's identity but he stays steadfast and doesn't do so. As the assassin is about to kill him, Adeel reveals a hidden pistol and shoots one of the men in the leg, causing panic. He manages to shoot the assassin through the ear as well and narrowly escapes.

The business tycoon sends gangsters to attack Inspector Ibrahim's house who survives but his daughter is killed in the confusion, leaving the inspector completely heartbroken. Enraged and hopeless, he plans a grand attack on the tycoon's mansion, and sneaks in with a lot of police. However, they discover that the man already has a lot of security in place.

An injured Adeel is taken to the hospital, where Alia arrives to face the assassin who is looking for her. She narrowly escapes him, but he catches up and starts strangling her. Adeel crawls out of his bed but unable to help, he is left with no other choice than to start the smoke alarms. The assassin is distracted for a while, giving Alia enough time to get free. A weak Adeel tries to fight the assassin but is knocked out. However, not before he pushes the assassin, making him drop his gun. Alia swoops at it, and shoots the assassin dead, her mission complete.

The police and the business tycoon's security ensue an elaborate battle which seems to be in the hands of Inspector Ibrahim's forces but slowly, the guards turn the tide and both sides suffer heavy losses. However, Ibrahim is able to shoot both the man and his son, completing his revenge, before he himself is shot in the back and collapses.

The film ends with phone footage showing Noman and Alia's happy memories together, before cutting off to Adeel seemingly enjoying his life in Dubai. He then records a video message for Alia saying he thinks life in Dubai is fun, but he can't fit in, and will return to Karachi soon.

Cast 

Ahmed Ali Akbar as Adeel Alam
Ali Kazmi as Noman Malik
Mansha Pasha as Aaliyah Malik
Syed Mohammad Ahmed
Rashid Farooqui as Inspector Ibrahim
Mojiz Hasan
Saleem Meraj
Syed Arsalan
Hammad Sidiq
Ishtiaq Omar
Kaleem Ghour
Faiza Gillani

Production

Filming 
Laal Kabootar was filmed in Karachi. Ahmed Ali Akbar confirmed that the film was shot in Karachi.

Release 
The trailer of Laal Kabootar was released on 18 March 2019. Many teasers of Laal Kabootar came in February and Ahmed Ali Akbar himself visited many cinemas to promote the film.

Home media 
Laal Kabootar had the world television premiers on 31 August 2019 on Geo Entertainment at 8:00 PST.

Reception

Box office
After its first week it earned Rs. 1.30 crore, while the numbers went to Rs. 2.11 cr after its second week, Rs. 2.41 cr at the end of the third week, and Rs. 2.91 cr at the end of the fourth week.

Critical reception

Laal Kabootar opened to roaring applause and critical acclaim from both the audience and critics alike.

Rahul Aijaz of The Express Tribune rated 5 out of 5 stars. While praising the film's cast he wrote, "Akbar and Pasha make a formidable on-screen pair. The former's finally getting the limelight he deserves and the latter is only beginning to tap into her potential." He further praised the direction and cinematography and marked, "Khan, on the other hand, oversees the project to perfection and let the film breathe on its own. Stunningly shot by acclaimed cinematographer Mo Azmi, the film shows how camera can play an active ‘character’ in the film." and concluded that "Laal Kabootar will make you regain your faith in Pakistani cinema. Must watch!."

Hamna Zubair of Images Dawn mentioned that "The film walks a knife's edge between stirring up hope and raising a mirror to Karachi's harsh, gritty realities". While giving a positive review, she further elaborated, "Laal Kabootar has many strengths, and one of them is its neatly plotted script. Screenwriter Ali Abbas Naqvi has proved himself skilled." She further praised the acting mentioning that "Laal Kabootar is incredibly well-cast. It depends on lesser-known acting talent to flesh out its ranks, proving that big names don't necessarily equal good films." and especially praised Akbar and Pasha writing that "Mansha Pasha and Ahmed Ali Akbar are A-plus. Mansha plays Aliya with great restraint, which is on point" and "Ahmed Ali Akbar brings a grit and authenticity that is equal to what Karachi's streets demand of men. I can't imagine anyone else playing these roles."

Ifrah Salman of Oye Yeah gave a positive review and remarked, "Strong and intense performances come on the back of a well written story by Abbas Ali Naqvi and superb direction by Kamal Khan." Galaxy Lollywood gave the film 3.5/5 stars and praised its acting, direction and cinematography and wrote, "The film definitely gives the not-so-explored genre of crime thrillers in Pakistan, a remarkable boost, with almost everything well-done." Seerat Kamran of dailytimes.com.pk praised the film and wrote, "brilliant acting makes you forget the slow pace of the film." The writer of Karachista thoroughly praised the film and remarked that, "Laal Kabootar should rightly be the first hit to come out of our industry this year."

Soundtrack

Awards and nominations

See also 

 List of Pakistani films of 2019
 Ahmed Ali Akbar
 List of submissions to the 92nd Academy Awards for Best International Feature Film
 List of Pakistani submissions for the Academy Award for Best International Feature Film

References

External links

2010s Urdu-language films
2019 films
Pakistani thriller films
Films set in Karachi
Films shot in Karachi
Pakistani crime action films
Pakistani action thriller films
2019 action thriller films
Films scored by Taha Malik
2019 crime thriller films